The Old Nogales City Hall and Fire Station, in Nogales, Arizona, US, was built in 1914. It was listed on the National Register of Historic Places in 1980.

It is a two-story Mission Revival-style building designed by Tucson architect Henry O. Jaastad. It has a very prominent clock tower.

References

City halls in Arizona
Fire stations in Arizona
National Register of Historic Places in Santa Cruz County, Arizona
Mission Revival architecture in Arizona
Buildings and structures completed in 1914